Coccinellidae is a widespread family of small beetles. They are commonly known as ladybugs in North America and ladybirds in Great Britain. Entomologists prefer the names ladybird beetles or lady beetles to avoid confusion with true bugs. Many of the species have conspicuous aposematic colours and patterns, such as red with black spots, that warn potential predators that they are distasteful.

The majority of the more than 6,000 described species are generally considered beneficial insects, because many prey on herbivorous hemipterans such as aphids or scale insects, which are agricultural pests. Many coccinellids lay their eggs directly in aphid and scale insect colonies, ensuring their larvae have an immediate food source. However, some species such as the herbivorous Mexican bean beetle are agricultural pests.

Etymology 

The name coccinellids, created by Pierre André Latreille, is derived from the Latin word coccineus meaning "scarlet". The name ladybird originated in Britain where the insects became known as "Our Lady's bird" or the Lady beetle. Mary (Our Lady) was often depicted wearing a red cloak in early paintings, and the spots of the seven-spot ladybird (the most common in Europe) were said to symbolise her seven joys and seven sorrows. In the United States, the name was popularly adapted to ladybug. Entomologists prefer the names ladybird beetles or lady beetles to avoid confusion with true bugs. Names in some other countries may be similar; for example, in Germany they are known as Marienkäfer meaning Marybeetle or ladybeetle.

Description 

Coccinellids generally oval shaped with domed backs and flattened undersides. Females tend to be larger than males. As adults, these insects differ from their closest relatives by having five pairs of spiracles on the abdomen; a tentorium with separated branches at the front and no bridge; no line dividing the frons and clypeus (frontoclypeal suture); maxillary palps with non-needle-shaped tips, divided galea and lacinia; smaller molar (flattened) area of the mandile; The coxal cavities (holes where the leg articulates with the thorax) that open from the back in the front of the thorax and from the front in the middle of the thorax; epimeron (corner plates) on the metathorax with parallel edges; The second sternum on the abdomen having femoral lines; and a tube-shaped, shipon-like genatilia in the male. The tarsal forumla for adult coccinellids is 4-4-4 or 3-3-3. Larval insects are covered in setae, the abdominal segments in particular each having six divided into pairs, and one to three segmented antennae.

Coccinellids are often distinctively coloured and patterned. The wing covers or elytron may be light with dark spots or dark with light spots. Light areas are typically yellow, red, orange or brown, and the spots vary in size and shape and numbers. The head and scutum also vary in light and dark colouration. Some species have striped or checkered patterns. The pigment carotene creates the lighter colours, while melanins create darker colours. These colour patterns typically serve as warning colouration, but some can act as camouflage, attract mates or even regulate heat. Several individual species may display polymorphism and even change colour between seasons.

Evolution

Fossil history 

Coccinellids are found worldwide, with over 6,000 species described. They are sparsely preserved in the fossil record. Although molecular clock estimates have placed their origin in the Cretaceous, the oldest fossils of the group are known from the Oise amber of France, dating to the Early Eocene (Ypresian) around 53 million years ago, which belong to the extant genera Rhyzobius  and Nephus. The greatest number of fossils comes from the younger Eocene Baltic amber, including members of the extant genera Serangium and Rhyzobius as well as extinct genera belonging to the tribes Microweiseini (Baltosidis) and Sticholotidini (Electrolotis).

Phylogeny 

The Coccinellidae are within the superfamily Coccinelloidea, which in turn is part of the infraorder Cucujiformia, a group containing most of the plant-eating beetles. The ladybirds form the majority of the species in the Coccinelloidea; many of the rest are small bark beetles.

The internal phylogeny of the Coccinellidae has been studied using gene sampling across many species by Che and colleagues in 2021. It identified three subfamilies including one newly-identified, the Monocoryninae. All three subfamilies were strongly supported, but the study noted that at lower classification levels, while the tribes are mostly monophyletic, their relationships are only weakly supported. The study suggests that the crown group appeared some 143 Mya in the Early Cretaceous, and that the group diversified rapidly during the Late Cretaceous, perhaps because the growth in diversity of angiosperm plants then encouraged the radiation of Sternorrhyncha such as aphids on which ladybirds could feed.

Biology

Lifecycle 

In temperate climates, coccinellids breed from late spring to early summer, while tropical species reproduce during the wet season. Mating is promiscuous. Males produce sperm packets each with 14,000 sperm, and insert three of them into the female, even though she can only hold 18,000 sperm. This is likely a form of sperm competition. Like other insects, coccinellids develop from eggs, to larvae, to pupa and finally adult. Eggs tend to be bright yellow, and the females lay them close together, standing upright a near where they can access food. The number of eggs in a cluster can vary depending on the species; it is typically in the double digits but some species can lay over a thousand eggs in their lifetime. 

After hatching, the elongated larvae will began eating, including the other eggs in their clutch. They eventually transition into a pupa as they shed their skin, develop a hunch and a glue-like substance fuses their legs to their body. The pupa attaches to the surface for the emergence of the adult. The length of each development stages varies based on climate and between species. For Adalia bipunctata, eggs hatch after four to eight days, the larvae stage lasts around three weeks while the pupa lasts seven to ten days. The lifespan of an adult is reaches up to a year.

Most species overwinter as adults in diapause, aggregating on the south sides of large objects such as trees or houses during the winter months, and dispersing in response to increasing day length in the spring. In the tropics, coccinellids enter dormancy during dry season.

Diet 

Coccinellids are best known as predators of Sternorrhyncha such as aphids and scale insects, but the range of prey species that various Coccinellidae may attack is much wider. A genus of small black ladybirds, Stethorus, predates non-Sternorrhyncha; they specialise in mites as prey, notably Tetranychus spider mites. Stethorus species accordingly are important in biological control on many fruit crops.

Several genera feed on various insects or their eggs; for example, Coleomegilla species are significant predators of the eggs and larvae of moths such as Spodoptera and the Plutellidae. Larvae and eggs of ladybirds, either their own or of other species, can also be an important food resource when alternative prey are scarce. The Coccinellidae used to be regarded as purely carnivorous, but they are far more omnivorous than previously thought, both as a family and in individual species; examination of gut contents of apparently specialist predators commonly yield residues of pollen and other plant materials. Most predatory coccinellids include other items in their diets, such as honeydew, pollen, plant sap, nectar, and fungi.

Certain species lay extra infertile trophic eggs with the fertile eggs, providing a backup food source for the larvae when they hatch. The ratio of infertile to fertile eggs increases with scarcity of food at the time of egg laying.

Some species in the subfamily Epilachninae are herbivores.

Ecology 

The main predators of ladybirds are birds, but they are also the prey of frogs, wasps, spiders, and dragonflies. The bright aposematic colours of many coccinellids discourage potential predators, warning of their toxicity. Their haemolymph contains toxic alkaloids, most commonly polyazamacrolides and polyamines, as well as foul-smelling pyrazines. Some 50 types of alkaloids have been identified in ladybirds. When disturbed, ladybirds further defend themselves with reflex bleeding, exuding droplets of "blood" from their tibio-femoral (knee) joints, effectively presenting predators with a sample of their toxic and bitter body fluid. A 2015 study of five ladybird species found that their coloration honestly signalled their toxicity, implying genuine aposematism.

Changing environmental conditions and invasive species can cause rapid changes in ladybird abundance, as has been documented in the British Isles.

Relationship to humans

Biological control 

Ladybirds are natural predators of a range of serious pests, such as the European corn borer.

The larva of the vedalia ladybird Rodolia cardinalis is a specialist predator on a few species of Monophlebidae, in particular the cottony cushion scale Icerya purchasi. It was introduced to California in 1887 from Australia, to protect citrus trees from cottony cushion scale. The project was markedly successful, making it "a textbook example of the great potential of classical biological control as a tactic for suppressing invasive pests." The vedalia beetle was then used in 29 countries, again with success. This led to many further attempts to use ladybird species against pests. Around 179 ladybird species were deliberately introduced to North America in the 20th century, of which only 18 became established. Further, establishment does not guarantee effective biological control of the target species. Thus, the vedalia beetle's success looks exceptional compared to the Coccinellidae as a whole; reasons for this include its high prey specificity, short generation time, efficient discovery of host patches, and larval development completed on a single host insect.

Some species are voracious specialist predators, making them valuable as agents of biological control, at least when rapid impact is required, as with sudden outbreaks of aphids on crop plants. However, since many prey are transient or seasonal, high specificity and voracity can equally be a disadvantage. Ladybird species vary in specificity; those that are dominant in specific communities are often rather generalist in their diet. Species that are able to multiply quickly in response to aphid outbreaks are mostly generalists, enabling them to survive on other prey while aphids are scarce. The variability of ladybird responses to prey has made finding suitable species for use as biological control agents difficult; out of 155 deliberate introductions meant to control aphids by the year 2000, only one was deemed to be "substantially successful".

Invasive species 

Harmonia axyridis (the multicoloured Asian lady beetle or harlequin ladybird) was introduced into North America from Asia in 1979 to control aphids, but it is now the most common species, outcompeting many of the native species. It has become a domestic and agricultural pest in some regions, and gives cause for ecological concern. It has similarly arrived in South Africa, where it has proved variously unwelcome, perhaps most prominently in vine-related crops. The populations in South Africa and South America originated independently from eastern North America. The population in Europe originated partly from eastern North America, and partly from deliberate introduction as a biological control agent in 1982.  It has since spread to much of western Europe, reaching the UK in 2004.

Coccinella septempunctata, another introduced species in North America, similarly outcompetes and displaces native coccinellids.

Infestations 

In North America, coccinellids usually begin to appear indoors in the autumn when they leave their summer feeding sites in fields, forests, and yards and search out places to spend the winter. Typically, when temperatures warm to the mid-60s °F (around 18 °C) in the late afternoon, following a period of cooler weather, they swarm onto or into buildings illuminated by the sun. Swarms of the insects fly to buildings near fields or woods in September through November depending on weather conditions. After an abnormally long period of hot, dry weather in the summer of 1976 in the UK, a marked increase in the aphid population was followed by a "plague" of ladybirds, with many reports of people being bitten as the supply of aphids dwindled.

The herbivorous Mexican bean beetle is an agricultural pest.
 
The presence of coccinellids in grape harvests can cause ladybird taint in wines produced from the grapes.

In culture

Ladybirds have long been of interest to children. They once had many regional names in English, such as variations on Bishop-Barnaby (Norfolk and Suffolk dialect) – Barnabee, Burnabee, the Bishop-that-burneth, and bishy bishy barnabee. The etymology is unclear, but it may be from St. Barnabas's feast in June, when the insect appears, or a corruption of "Bishop-that-burneth", from the fiery elytra of the beetles. In the 17th century, they were sometimes named "ladycows".

The ladybird was immortalised in the popular children's nursery rhyme Ladybird Ladybird, dated from at least 1744:

Ladybirds have been associated with sunny weather and their behaviour was believed to prognosticate good weather.

In Christian areas, the insects are often associated with the Virgin Mary, and their names in the various languages of Europe corresponds to this. Although historically many European languages referenced Freyja, the fertility goddess of Norse mythology, in the names, the Virgin Mary has now largely supplanted her as the "Lady", so that, for example, freyjuhœna (Old Norse) and Frouehenge have been changed into Mariehone in Danish, marihøne in Norwegian and Marienkäfer in German. In Swedish it is Maria Nyckelpiga, Mary the key-maid (who holds the key to heaven). Sometimes, the insect is referred to as belonging directly to God, with Irish bóín Dé, Polish boża krówka, Russian божья коровка [bozhya korovka], and Spanish Vaquilla de Dios, all meaning 'God's [little] cow'. 

The insects have been used to symbolise Ladybird Books (part of Penguin Group), and the Ladybird range of children's clothing sold by the former high street chain Woolworth's in the UK, while the ladybird street tile is a symbol against senseless violence in the Netherlands, and is often placed on the sites of deadly crimes. They have been adopted as the mascot of Candanchú, a ski resort near Canfranc in the Spanish Pyrenees. The ladybird serves as a long-standing symbol for the Swedish People's Party of Finland. Various species have been adopted as US state insects in the states of Delaware, Massachusetts, New Hampshire, New York, North Dakota, Ohio, and Tennessee; some of those designated species, such as Coccinella septempunctata, are introduced rather than native to North America.

References

Sources

External links 

 
 

 
Beetle families
Biological pest control beetles
Insects used as insect pest control agents
Taxa named by Pierre André Latreille
Insects in culture